TenMarks Education, Inc. was an American company that provided personalized online math practice and enrichment programs for K-Algebra/Geometry using a structured approach of practice, on-demand hints, video lessons and real-time results. 

Founded in 2009, TenMarks Education had offices in San Francisco, CA and Boston, MA (formerly Newton, MA)

Amazon acquired TenMarks in 2013 and discontinued TenMarks apps in 2019.

Milestones
• June 2009: Launched Beta Program for Middle School Math (6th, 7th and 8th Grade), pilot at a Middle School in Boston
• July 2009: Launched the "Step Up" Math Summer Program for Middle Schoolers
• September 2009: Raised First Round of Angel Investment
• October 2009: TenMarks goes Live with Middle School Curriculum in Math
• December 2009: TenMarks Live for Elementary School - Math for Grades 3,4,5 added
• January 2010: TenMarks Rolled Out at two Schools to Measure Efficacy
• February 2010:  TenMarks for High School Math Launched
• March 2010:  TenMarks Placement Assessment Released to Help Automate Personalization of TenMarks Curriculum
• April 2010: TenMarks launches TeacherZone - A free library of math videos for teachers
• May 2010: TenMarks launches Summer Programs – Offering 19 different, customized step up and foundation programs for students to combat Summer Learning Loss
• May 2010: TenMarks wins Dr. Toy The Best Vacation Product Award
• October 2013: Amazon acquires TenMarks to assist in pushing education through the kindle market.

• April 2018 - Amazon announced plans to stop offering TenMarks’ learning apps after June 30, 2019.

References

External links
 TenMarks Home Page 

Amazon (company) acquisitions
Education companies of the United States
2009 establishments in California
2019 disestablishments in California